Brennin Hunt is an American actor and singer-songwriter.  He competed on the debut season of The X Factor, and played Roger Davis in Fox's television musical Rent: Live. He made his Broadway theatre debut as Edward Lewis in Pretty Woman: The Musical in July 2019. He also appeared in Walking With Herb (2021) as Marco Figureoa.

Filmography

Film

Television

References

Living people
21st-century American male actors
The X Factor (American TV series) contestants
Year of birth missing (living people)